Dioscorea abysmophila is a herbaceous vine in the genus Dioscorea. It is native to Venezuela, with the type locality listed as "Estado do Amazonas, São Gabriel, Rio Negro." A note included with the type specimen, collected in 1945, indicates that the specimen was collected from rocky terrain on a high mountain range.
Another specimen, collected in 2000, is listed as being collected from the forested northern slope of a coastal mountain range near the headwaters of the Temerla river.

References 

abysmophila
Plants described in 1989